Alicia Rodríguez Martínez (born 23 June 1936) is a Mexican politician from the Institutional Revolutionary Party. In 2009 she served as Deputy of the LX Legislature of the Mexican Congress representing Morelos.

References

1936 births
Living people
Politicians from Morelos
Women members of the Chamber of Deputies (Mexico)
Institutional Revolutionary Party politicians
21st-century Mexican politicians
21st-century Mexican women politicians
Deputies of the LX Legislature of Mexico
Members of the Chamber of Deputies (Mexico) for Morelos